Edward Francis McEvoy, sometimes spelled MacEvoy, (5 September 1826 – 10 February 1899) was an Irish Liberal and Independent Irish Party politician.

McEvoy was the son of James McEvoy of Tobertinan (Tobertynan House & Estate, Rathmolyon, County Meath) and Theresa Maria Meredyth, daughter of Sir Joshua Colles Meredyth. He joined Magdalene College, Cambridge in 1845. In April 1846, he joined the 6th Dragoon Guards as a cornet, and between 1847 and 1851, he was a lieutenant of the same group. He married Eliza Browne, daughter of Andrew Browne of Mount Hazel in 1850. Together they had one child: Pauline Mary McEvoy (–1944), who married the 4th Duke of Stacpoole.

At some point, he was a Justice of the Peace. He also received the Order of St. Gregory the Great.

At a by-election in 1855, McEvoystood as an Independent Irish candidate and was elected as one of the two Members of Parliament (MPs) for Meath . He was again elected at the next general election in 1859 and shortly after joined the Liberal Party on its formation. He then held the seat until 1874 when he stood down.

Arms

References

External links
 

1826 births
1899 deaths
Irish Liberal Party MPs
UK MPs 1852–1857
UK MPs 1857–1859
UK MPs 1859–1865
UK MPs 1865–1868
UK MPs 1868–1874
Members of the Parliament of the United Kingdom for County Meath constituencies (1801–1922)